Famelica tajourensis is a species of sea snail, a marine gastropod mollusk in the family Raphitomidae.

Description

Distribution
Thisspecies occurs in the Gulf of Aden.

References

 Sysoev, A.V. (1996b) Deep-sea conoidean gastropods collected by the John Murray Expedition, 1933–34. Bulletin of the Natural History Museum of London, Zoology, 62, 1–30
 

tajourensis
Gastropods described in 1987